Albert George Landt (19 September 1888 – 9 November 1954) was an Australian rules footballer who played for the St Kilda Football Club in the Victorian Football League (VFL).

Notes

External links 

1888 births
1954 deaths
Australian rules footballers from Victoria (Australia)
St Kilda Football Club players
People educated at Melbourne High School